Paadasaram is a 1978 Indian Malayalam-language film, directed by A.N. Thampi and produced by Sivan Kunnampilly. The film stars Jose, Shobha, Raji and T. G. Ravi. The film has musical score by G. Devarajan.

Cast
 
Jose as Rameshan
Shobha as Shoba
Raji as Thulasi
T. G. Ravi as Ravi
Kaviyoor Ponnamma  as Kamalakshi
P. J. Antony as Pulluvan
Aranmula Ponnamma as Bhavani
Baby Sangeetha as Omana
Kottarakkara Sreedharan Nair as Poomangalathu Unnithan
Kuthiravattam Pappu 
Santha Devi as Pulluvathi Kochukaali

Soundtrack
The music was composed by G. Devarajan with lyrics by G. K. Pallath, G. Gopalakrishnan and A. P. Gopalan.

References

External links
 

1978 films
1970s Malayalam-language films
Indian drama films